Located within 11 counties in the Sacramento Valley and the Sacramento-San Joaquin Delta of California, North Central Valley Wildlife Management Area consists of conservation easements acquired on privately owned wetlands (primarily waterfowl hunting clubs). The landscape is very flat, bordered by the Sierra and Coast ranges and is surrounded by intensive agriculture.

The area is an expansion of the highly successful Butte Sink and Willow Creek-Lurline Wildlife Management Areas and is implemented in accordance with the habitat acquisition goals of the Central Valley Habitat Joint Venture of the North American Waterfowl Management Plan. Conservation easement requires landowners to maintain land in wetlands.

References
Area profile
Area website

National Wildlife Refuges in California
Wetlands of California